is a quasi-national park covering a portion of  Noto Peninsula of Ishikawa Prefecture and Toyama Prefecture in Japan. It is rated a protected landscape (category V) according to the IUCN.

 in the northern half of Ishikawa Prefecture, extends about 100 kilometers into the Sea of Japan. The peninsula is known for its coastal scenery and rural atmosphere. The Quasi-National Park covers much of the coastline, one side of which faces Toyama Bay and other side of which faces the Sea of Japan.

The borders of the park span the municipalities of Nanao, Suzu, Wajima, Hakui, Anamizu, Noto, Shika, Hōdatsushimizu and Nakanoto in Ishikawa Prefecture and Toyama and Himi in Toyama Prefecture.

Like all Quasi-National Parks of Japan, Noto Hantō Quasi-National Park is managed by the local prefectural governments.

See also
List of national parks of Japan

References
Southerland, Mary and Britton, Dorothy. The National Parks of Japan. Kodansha International (1995).

External links
 
 Ishikawa Prefectural site

National parks of Japan
Protected areas established in 1968
1968 establishments in Japan
Parks and gardens in Ishikawa Prefecture
Parks and gardens in Toyama Prefecture